Edmund Pytts may refer to:

 Edmund Pytts (died 1753), British politician, MP for Worcestershire
 Edmund Pytts (died 1781), British politician, MP for Worcestershire (son of the above)

See also
 Edmund L. Pitts